Percy Bishop may refer to:

 Percy Cooke Bishop (1869–1961), British journalist and philatelist
 Percy Poe Bishop (1877–1967), U.S. Army general